Duncan Lake or Lake Duncan or variation, may refer to:

Places

Lakes
A lake, one of many lakes around the world.

Canada
One of several lakes in Canada:

 Duncan Lake (British Columbia) in British Columbia. Four lakes by this name.
 Duncan Lake (Manitoba) in Manitoba
 Duncan Lake (Northwest Territories) in the Northwest Territories
 Duncan Lake (Ontario) in Ontario. Natural Resources Canada website lists seven lakes in the province.
 Duncan Lake (Quebec) in Quebec
 Duncan Lake (Saskatchewan) in Saskatchewan. Two lakes by this name.

United States
One of several lakes in the United States:

 Lake Duncan (Oklahoma), a reservoir for Duncan City, Oklahoma; near Fuqua Lake
 Duncan Lake (Michigan)
 Duncan Lake (Minnesota)
 Duncan Lake (Montana)
 Duncan Lake (New Hampshire)
 Duncan Lake (Tennessee)
 Duncan Lake (Texas)
 Duncan Lake (Wyoming)

Other places
Places that are not lakes:

 Duncan Lake 1, British Columbia, and Indian Reserve in British Columbia

Other uses
 Lake Duncan, a Design 1020 ship WWI U.S. emergency-war-lift cargo ship

See also

 Duncan (disambiguation)
 Lake (disambiguation)